Alexander Michael Roe-Brown is a British actor. He is best known for playing Jay Keaton in the series The Fugitives, Elliott Baden in The Cut and Benjamin Pownall in Siren. He has also played major roles in a number of films, including Hot Summer Nights, Rings and Forever My Girl.

Early life and education 
Roe was born in London, and grew up in Ladbroke Grove. He has a twin sister, Katheryne Elizabeth. His father worked as a plumber and his mother was a ballet dancer. He won a sixth-form scholarship to Latymer Upper School in Hammersmith where he studied until 2009.

He enjoys sports especially association football playing as a striker. He joined a Division Two football club when he was 16, and then played in Spain for a year. After he returned to school in England and before his acting career took off, he played semi-professional football with Chalfont St Peter.  While he was acting on network television, he was also playing for a Hayes Middlesex Sunday league football team Chiswick Albion in 2010. He continued playing football after he relocated to Los Angeles, where he plays for an amateur team Atlético Silverlake.

Career 
Roe first appeared in an advertisement for Milky Way as a child. He made his acting debut in 2000 in the horror film The Calling when he was 10 years old.  Roe also played the lead role of Jay Keaton in CITV's 2005 children's science fiction series The Fugitives. 

Jennifer Saunders saw him performing in a school production of Our Country's Good and asked him to audition for her comedy Jam & Jerusalem. After appearing in this production in 2009, he began to land more acting roles. In 2010, Roe played Elliott Baden, a popular competitive swimmer in BBC Two's teen drama The Cut. In 2011, Roe appeared in guest appearances in episodes of Holby City as Connor Lane, Doctors as Matt Goonan, Hollyoaks as Toby, and The Jury as Schoolboy.

In 2014, Roe landed his first television role in the United States and played the male lead as Luke Holt in ABC Family's tennis drama film Unstrung. He relocated to Los Angeles and worked in a number of Hollywood films. Roe played one of the lead roles, Evan Walker, in the 2016 science fiction film The 5th Wave, followed with a starring role as Holt Anthony in the 2017 horror film Rings.

Roe co-starred with Timothée Chalamet in the coming-of-age film Hot Summer Nights, which premiered at the South by Southwest festival in March 2017, and was released the next year. Also in 2018, he played the leading role as a country singer in Forever My Girl, and learned to sing for the role; and started playing the lead role as Ben Pownall in Freeform's TV series, Siren.

Filmography

Film

Television

References

External links 
 

Living people
1990 births
Footballers from Westminster
Male actors from London
English male film actors
English male television actors
English footballers
21st-century English male actors
English male child actors
Chalfont St Peter A.F.C. players
Association football forwards